Michael Younesi (born February, 1987) is an American filmmaker, whose directing and producing work includes television, films and advertisements. He is perhaps best known as director and executive producer of the Emmy-nominated Netflix series Project Mc2. He also directed the short film Liberation. He is a graduate of the USC School of Cinematic Arts. In December 2019, Younesi wrote and directed the original movie, Adventure Force 5 for Vudu and Studio71.

Filmography

References

External links
 

Living people
American film directors
American film producers
American television directors
American television producers
USC School of Cinematic Arts alumni
1987 births